Michael John Arnone (born September 10, 1932) is an American Republican Party politician who served in the New Jersey General Assembly from 1989 to 2004, where he represented the 12th legislative district.

Born in Red Bank, New Jersey, Arnone attended Red Bank Catholic High School before attending St. Francis College. Arnone graduated from Seton Hall University and received his D.D.S. from the Temple University School of Dentistry.

Political career
Arnone was the Mayor of Red Bank, New Jersey from 1978 to 1990, was the Red Bank Fire and Police Commissioner from 1970-1973 served on the Red Bank Council from 1969–1973 and as the borough's Zoning Board Chair in 1969. Arnone served in the United States Army from 1959–61, attaining the rank of captain. 

Arnone served in the Assembly on the Housing & Local Government Committee. 

Arnone and fellow-Republican running mate Clare Farragher were defeated in the 2003 elections by Democrats Michael J. Panter and Robert Lewis Morgan.

References

External links
, New Jersey Legislature

Mayors of Red Bank, New Jersey
Living people
1932 births
American dentists
Mayors of places in New Jersey
Republican Party members of the New Jersey General Assembly
People from Red Bank, New Jersey
Red Bank Catholic High School alumni
Seton Hall University alumni
St. Francis College alumni
Temple University alumni